Armand Deumi Tchani (born 12 March 1979) is a Cameroonian former professional footballer who played as a defender. He made three FIFA-official appearances for the Cameroon national team.

Club career
Deumi started his career in his native country of Cameroon playing for UCB Douala and Kadji Sport Academy de Douala. In 1999, he transferred to Switzerland to play for FC Sion. Deumi spent three years at FC Sion and was impressive enough to earn a move to Swiss league rivals FC Thun. He became a crucial part of the team but missed a large part of the 2003–04 season after suffering a ruptured knee ligament. After recovering from the injury, Deumi quickly reestablished himself in the FC Thun side and was considered by many to be the best defender playing in Switzerland as FC Thun achieved a second-place finish and a spot in next year's UEFA Champions League.

In June 2007, it was announced that Deumi had left FC Thun and signed a three-year deal with Gaziantepspor. In July 2010, he joined Karabükspor.

International career
Deumi came into the Cameroon team for the 2006 FIFA World Cup qualifier against Sudan in March 2005, and made his first start in June in the victory against Benin.

References

External links
 
 

1979 births
Living people
Cameroonian footballers
Cameroon international footballers
Association football defenders
Cameroonian expatriate footballers
Expatriate footballers in Switzerland
Expatriate footballers in Turkey
FC Thun players
FC Sion players
Gaziantepspor footballers
Kardemir Karabükspor footballers
Gaziantep F.K. footballers
Kadji Sports Academy players
Süper Lig players
Swiss Super League players
Footballers from Douala
TFF First League players